The Niue Island national rugby union team is the national team of the third tier rugby union playing nation of Niue Island. The team first started playing in 1983 in mainly competes in the Oceania Cup, which it won in 2008. Rugby union in Niue Island is administered by the Niue Rugby Football Union.

Results
Niue's first international match was at the 1983 South Pacific Games in Suva against hosts . The Niueans managed to score a try against the eventual tournament winners but were defeated by 124–4. The team found success in the 2008 Oceania Cup, defeating New Caledonia by 27–5 in the final on 1 September 2008.

As of 29 May 2013, Niue was ranked 71st in the IRB world rankings. The team had played 10 international matches by that time, four against the Cook Islands and three against Tahiti. Other matches have been against Fiji, New Caledonia and Vanuatu.

Players
Some of Niue's best players are professionals in New Zealand. Former Niue captain Matt Faleuka played for Northland before moving to Italian club Overmach Rugby Parma in 2007.

While the Niue and the Cook Islands teams did not compete in the Pacific Tri-Nations competition, they did supply players to the squad for the Pacific Islanders' tour in 2004 (but not in 2006).

The Niue sevens team have been active in the IRB World Sevens and the Commonwealth Games.

Record

World Cup

Overall

Current squad
The squad was selected for the 2019 Oceania Rugby Cup.

See also
 Rugby union in Niue

References

External links
Report of the FORU Oceania Cup Final

 
Oceanian national rugby union teams
Rugby union in Niue